Jeff Blumenkrantz (born June 3, 1965) is an American actor, composer and lyricist.

Born in Long Branch, New Jersey, Blumenkrantz is a graduate of Northwestern University School of Communication. His stage credits include roles in the Broadway productions Into the Woods (1987), The Threepenny Opera (1989), Damn Yankees (1994), How to Succeed in Business Without Really Trying (1995), A Class Act (2001), and Bright Star (2016), and Off Broadway in Murder for Two, the City Center Encores productions of Anyone Can Whistle, God Bless You, Mr. Rosewater, and The Golden Apple, and the New York Philharmonic productions of Candide (as Maximillian) and Sweeney Todd (as The Beadle), both filmed for PBS. He has also appeared in such television shows as Succession (TV series), Pose (TV series), Mr. Robot, The Blacklist (TV series), Fosse/Verdon, The Detour, Will & Grace, 30 Rock, The Good Wife, Ugly Betty, Just Shoot Me!, and Law & Order, and the films The Big Sick and Joseph and the Amazing Technicolor Dreamcoat.

In 2000, noted Broadway actress and recording artist Audra McDonald included Blumenkrantz's song "I Won't Mind" on her CD, How Glory Goes. This lullaby (with lyrics by Annie Kessler and Libby Saines) has become a staple of McDonald's repertoire. Blumenkrantz also contributed a piece to The Seven Deadly Sins, a song cycle commissioned by Carnegie Hall for the singer. His comic song, "My Book," addressed the sin of sloth.

In 2003, Blumenkrantz was nominated for a Best Original Score Tony Award for his work on Urban Cowboy, a nomination he shared with Jason Robert Brown and others. He wrote the book, music, and lyrics for Scaffolding as part of the 2018 Inner Voices series. Scaffolding was directed by Victoria Clark and starred Rebecca Luker. His song "Ovid" was featured in the Prospect Theatre Company's production of Notes from Now at 59E59 Theaters.

In 2005–2006, he created and hosted The Jeff Blumenkrantz Songbook Podcast, a weekly podcast featuring the songs from his songbook, occasional additional episodes of which were released until at least February 2010. This project was succeeded in 2008 by the BMI Workshop Songbook Podcast, which Blumenkrantz hosted, showcasing the eponymous songbook, which features the work of members of the BMI Songwriters' Workshop.

Blumenkrantz is the recipient of the 2011 Fred Ebb Award for excellence in musical theatre songwriting.

Theatre credits

References

External links

Jeff Blumenkrantz at Internet Off-Broadway Database
 Official Web Site
 Fred Ebb Foundation

American lyricists
Jewish American male actors
American male stage actors
Northwestern University School of Communication alumni
People from Long Branch, New Jersey
1965 births
Living people
American musical theatre composers
Songwriters from New Jersey
21st-century American Jews